TKU may refer to:

Universities 
 Tamkang University, a private university in New Taipei, Taiwan
 Tokyo Keizai University, a private university in Kokubunji, Tokyo, Japan
 The King's University (Texas), a private university in Southlake, Texas, United States

Other uses 
 Three Kings United, the New Zealand football club
 TV Kumamoto, part of the Fuji News Network
 The Kristet Utseende, a Swedish punk/ metal group
 IATA code for Turku Airport, Finland